Ninnu Kalisaka is a 2009 Indian Telugu-language romance film produced by Ramoji Rao on Ushakiran Movies banner and directed by Siva Nageswara Rao. It stars Santosh Samrat, Chaitanya Krishna, Dipa Shah, Piaa Bajpai, and the music is composed by Sunil Kashyap.

Plot 
The film is a tale of two young pairs of lovers; Abhiram & Deepti, and Chandu & Bindu. Abhiram & Bindu are IT professionals both of them have been sent to the USA, where both of them are assigned the same project and become good friends. In India Chandu & Deepa are dance professionals, and both of them want to win a dance trophy. So they also come closer and become good friends.

However, after a few incidents, Abhiram & Bindu start feeling something more than friendship between them and confusion arises about whether it is love. Back in India, Chandu & Deepa win the trophy, everyone asks them whether they are in love then they say Yes but not with each other and they pair away. The time comes when the project is wrapped up and Abhiram decides to convey his feelings while Bindu is waiting for it. On their return, Abhiram meets a film star Jagapati Babu in the aircraft and narrates his story, and asks him for a solution. Then, he says First Love is always best Love which makes him realize that it is just infatuation with Bindu. Finally, Abhiram decides not to propose to Bindu & they meet their lovers at the airport and decide to marry them.

Cast 
 Santosh Samrat as Abhiram
 Chaitanya Krishna as Chandu
 Pia Bajpai as Bindu
 Dipa Shah as Deepti
 Siva Nageswara Rao
 Krishnudu as Chanti
 M. S. Narayana as Kali
 Sudeepa Pinky as Kommali
 Jogi Naidu
 Allari Subhashini as Mandodari
 Master Bharath as Joo Joo
 Siri vennela As Sirisha (Friend Character)
 Harinath Reddy Master (Choreographer)
 Jagapati Babu as himself (Cameo appearance)
 Tarun Master as himself (Cameo appearance)

Soundtrack 

The music was composed by Sunil Kashyap and released by the Mayuri Audio Company.

Source:

References 

2009 films
2000s Telugu-language films
Films directed by Siva Nageswara Rao